Glenn Ikonen (born 29 April 1955) is a Swedish Paralympic wheelchair curler. He was on the bronze medal-winning Swedish team at the 2006 Winter Paralympics and competed at the 2010 Winter Paralympics, where he was suspended for six months for use of an illegal drug, a blood pressure medicine he had taken for 4–5 years, prescribed by his doctor. He moved to Sweden from Finland in 1979.

Results

References

External links

Profile at the Official Website for the 2010 Winter Paralympics in Vancouver

1955 births
Swedish male curlers
Swedish wheelchair curlers
Wheelchair curlers at the 2006 Winter Paralympics
Wheelchair curlers at the 2010 Winter Paralympics
Wheelchair curlers at the 2014 Winter Paralympics
Paralympic wheelchair curlers of Sweden
Medalists at the 2006 Winter Paralympics
Medalists at the 2010 Winter Paralympics
Paralympic bronze medalists for Sweden
Swedish sportspeople in doping cases
Living people
Place of birth missing (living people)
Finnish emigrants to Sweden
Swedish people of Finnish descent
Paralympic medalists in wheelchair curling
21st-century Swedish people